Eddy Antoine (born 27 August 1949) is a Haitian former footballer who played at both professional and international levels as a midfielder.

Club career
After playing for Racing CH and New Jersey Brewers, Antoine spent time in the North American Soccer League with the Chicago Sting.

International career
Antoine also represented the Haitian national team at international level, and participated at the 1974 FIFA World Cup.

References

1949 births
Living people
Haitian footballers
Haitian expatriate footballers
Haiti international footballers
Racing CH players
American Soccer League (1933–1983) players
New Jersey Brewers players
North American Soccer League (1968–1984) players
Chicago Sting (NASL) players
Expatriate soccer players in the United States
Haitian expatriate sportspeople in the United States
1974 FIFA World Cup players
CONCACAF Championship-winning players
Association football midfielders